Riz Ab (also Romanized as Rīz Āb; also known as Rehzow, Rīz Āb Bālā, and Rizau) is a village in Baqeran Rural District, in the Central District of Birjand County, South Khorasan Province, Iran. At the 2006 census, its population was 111, in 37 families.

References 

Populated places in Birjand County